The John Lennon Art and Design Building (formerly the Art and Design Academy) in Liverpool, England, houses Liverpool John Moores University's School of Art and Design. The school was formerly located at the Grade II listed Liverpool College of Art, which now houses LJMU's School of Humanities and Social Science.

It is located at Duckinfield Street in LJMU's Mount Pleasant Campus, immediately adjacent to the Liverpool Metropolitan Cathedral. The six-storey building was constructed between 2005 and 2008 at a cost of £27 million. The RIBA award winning John Lennon Art and Design Building was designed by Rick Mather Architects, during construction the contractor was Wates Construction and the structural and services engineer was Ramboll UK. The building was officially renamed on the 1 July 2013 after John Lennon's widow, Yoko Ono, gave the university her blessing to use the Lennon name in recognition of her husband's links with the College of Art and the City of Liverpool.

ICT facilities, workshops and a café are also located in the building – which is also available for conference venue and facility hire. The building houses a public gallery and a public café.

History
Liverpool School of Art and Design is the oldest art and design school in England outside London.  In 1825, Liverpool Mechanics’ School of Art Institute was established, providing and education for working men.  In 1856 the school had changed name to become The Liverpool Institute and School of Art. This then moved to Liverpool College of Art on Hope Street in 1880 to a new building to house the School of Art.  In 2000, the school developed to cater for a much broader field of subjects and it moved into the current building in 2008.

Awards
The building has received several awards.  In 2011 it received the Civic Trust Award and in 2010 it received the WAN Education Sector Award.

Exhibitions
The school has hosted several exhibitions, including the prestigious RIBA President's Medals Students Award.  Each year the school hosts a degree show with students displaying work from Architecture, Fashion, Fine Art and Graphic Design and Illustration. The fashion graduates also present their work in a fashion show. The school hosts the Exhibition Research Centre, the UK's first centre for the study of exhibition cultures. Opened in 2012, the ERC has hosted exhibitions of work by Adrian Henri, György Kepes and L’Internationale.

Alumni
Kay Anderson - painter
Margaret Blundell - painter
Dorothy Bradford - painter
May Louise Greville Cooksey - painter
Bill Drummond – musician, artist
Edith Edmonds - painter
David Gray – musician
Jane Greenwood – costume designer
Shirley Hughes – author and illustrator
John Lennon – musician
Don McKinlay - painter, sculptor, printmaker*
Stanley Reed - painter
Phoebe Stabler - sculptor
Norman Thelwell – cartoonist
Pat Jourdan - painter , writer

Gallery

References

Buildings and structures in Liverpool
Liverpool John Moores University
Recipients of Civic Trust Awards
Art schools in England